Ana Vrljić (born 1 August 1984) is an inactive professional Croatia tennis player.

Vrljić has won four singles and eleven doubles titles on the ITF Women's Circuit. On 24 June 2013, she reached her highest singles ranking of world No. 180. On 26 August 2013, she peaked at No. 149 in the doubles rankings.

Playing for Croatia Fed Cup team, Vrljić has a win–loss record of 4–3.

Tennis career
She started playing tennis at the age of four, her favorite surface is hardcourt. At the Mediterranean Games, she won the silver medal in women's doubles along with Matea Mezak.

Vrljić made it to the quarterfinals of the 2010 Swedish Open, defeating Angelique Kerber and Arantxa Rus but she lost to Gisela Dulko.

ITF finals

Singles: 16 (4–12)

Doubles: 21 (11–10)

References

External links

 
 
 

1984 births
Living people
Croatian female tennis players
Tennis players from Zagreb
Mediterranean Games silver medalists for Croatia
Competitors at the 2005 Mediterranean Games
Mediterranean Games medalists in tennis